Julia Woolfolk Cunningham (October 4, 1916 – February 27, 2008) was an American author of children's literature.

She is best remembered for her novel Dorp Dead which won the Lewis Carroll Shelf Award, and for The Treasure Is The Rose which was a finalist for the National Book Award.

She was sister to John W. Cunningham, a Western author who created the story of the influential film High Noon. Her first cousin was the neuroscientist and physician John C. Lilly.

References

External links

 

1916 births
2008 deaths
American children's writers